Anna Maria Mengs, or Ana Carmona (1751–1792), was a German artist; known largely for portraits.

Biography
Born in Dresden, she was the daughter of the painter Raphael Mengs and his wife, Margarita Guazzi. She studied art with her father. In 1777, she married the Spanish engraver Manuel Salvador Carmona. They had seven children.  

Her works include portraits in pastel and miniature; that of her husband is in the Real Academia de Bellas Artes de San Fernando, to which Mengs was admitted as a member of merit on August 29, 1790. She died in Madrid in 1792 and was interred at St Sebastian's Church.

In 1793, to mark the first anniversary of her death, the Academy of San Fernando presented an exhibition of Mengs' work. In 1800, in his Diccionario histórico de los más ilustres profesores de las Bellas Artes en España, Juan Agustín Ceán Bermúdez wrote of her that despite "seven births, and the care and education of her children, she did not stop painting miniatures and pastels with good taste and intelligence."

References

Attribution:
 

1751 births
1793 deaths
German portrait painters
Artists from Dresden
18th-century German painters
18th-century German women artists
German women painters
Portrait miniaturists
Pastel artists